The 2004 Danish Figure Skating Championships was held at the Herlev Skøjtehal in Herlev from December 12 to 14, 2003. Skaters competed in the disciplines of men's singles and ladies' singles. Not all disciplines were held on all levels due to a lack of participants.

Senior results

Men

Ladies

External links
 results

Danish Figure Skating Championships
2003 in figure skating
Danish Figure Skating Championships, 2004
Figure Skating Championships